In 2017, 2,503 deaths in England and Wales and 934 in Scotland were recorded as “drug misuse”. Deaths from drugs overtook traffic fatalities in the United Kingdom as a leading cause of death in 2008, and the numbers have continued to rise.

Those most likely to die are working class, over 40 and living in de-industrialised areas. Rates of death in the most deprived areas are 9 times those in the most prosperous.

The Advisory Council on the Misuse of Drugs recommended in 2016 that there should be wider provision of naloxone which can be used to block the effects of opioid overdose. and for the central funding of heroin-assisted treatment, with more  medically supervised drug consumption rooms and more opioid substitution therapy.  Since then spending on adult drug treatment services fell by 26% in the four years from 2014.

The Scottish Drugs Forum predicts more than 1,000 drug related deaths in 2018 in Scotland where deaths have more than doubled since 2007 when there were from 445. In the lead up to International Overdose Awareness Day called for synthetic, injectable heroin to be prescribed to addicts and greater use of take home naloxone kits.

Scotland 

Scotland has the worst drug-related/misuse mortality rate in Europe and in the UK as a whole. It is 3.5 times higher then England and Wales. In 2021, a total of 1,330 people died from drug-misuse. 

In the most deprived areas, the mortality rate is significantly higher and compared to the least deprived areas it is 18 times worse. There is also a gender divide within mortality rates, Males significantly are affected more by drug-misuse mortality rates then females. In 2021 the rate was 35.8 per 100,000 population in Males to 14.7 within Females. Age wise, the bands of 35 to 54 year olds suffer the most and make up approximately 2/3rds of drug-misuse deaths.

England and Wales

See also
 Controlled Drug in the United Kingdom
 Drug Equality Alliance
 Drug policy of the United Kingdom
 Drugs controlled by the UK Misuse of Drugs Act
 Transform Drug Policy Foundation

References

External links
 Scotland has highest drug death rate in EU. BBC News. Published 16 July 2019.
 It's time to decriminalise drug use to beat Scotland's crippling death crisis. Daily Record (Scotland). Published 4 July 2019.